Jero Wacik (born 24 April 1949) is an Indonesian politician from Singaraja, Bali. He served as Minister of Culture and Tourism since October 21, 2004 until October 18, 2011. He also served as Minister of Energy and Mineral Resources of Indonesia from October 19, 2011 to September 2, 2014 following his naming as a graft suspect by the Corruption Eradication Commission (KPK). He graduated with a degree in mechanical engineering from the Bandung Institute of Technology in 1974 and the University of Indonesia in 1983.
As member of cabinet, he served as one of the highest positions within the Democratic Party.

Legacy
Wacik was convicted of embezzlement and is sentenced by the Anti Corruption Court to four years in prison.

References

1949 births
Living people
Balinese people
University of Indonesia alumni
Bandung Institute of Technology alumni
Government ministers of Indonesia
Indonesian Hindus
Politicians from Bali
Indonesian politicians convicted of corruption